Josaphat Louis Lebulu (born June 13, 1942, in Kisangara) is a Catholic Archbishop Emeritus of Arusha in Tanzania.

He was ordained priest by Bishop Joseph Kilasara on 11 Dec 1968 in Catholic Diocese of Same. He was appointed Bishop of Same by Pope John Paul II on 12 Feb 1979, and received his episcopal consecration from Archbishop Laurean Rugambwa on 24 May 1979.

On 28 Nov 1998 Bishop Lebulu was appointed Bishop of Catholic Diocese of Arusha by Pope John Paul II and later on 16 March 1999 he was appointed the archbishop of Catholic Archdiocese of Arusha until his retirement on 27 December 2017. 

He served as president of the Council of Catholic Bishops in Tanzania (Tanzania Episcopal Conference TEC)(1988-1994). He also served as President of Association of Member Episcopal Conferences in Eastern Africa (1997 – 2008)

References

External links

20th-century Roman Catholic bishops in Tanzania
Living people
1942 births
Tanzanian Roman Catholic archbishops
Roman Catholic bishops of Arusha
Roman Catholic archbishops of Arusha
Roman Catholic bishops of Same